Nebria andalusia is a species of ground beetle in the Nebriinae subfamily. In Europe, it can be found in such countries as  Italy, Portugal, Spain, and on islands such as Malta and Sicily. It is also present in North Africa, in countries such as Algeria, Morocco, and Tunisia.

References

andalusia
Beetles described in 1837
Beetles of Europe
Taxa named by Jules Pierre Rambur